Igor Lomov (born 1956) is a Russian mathematician, Professor, Dr.Sc., a professor at the Faculty of Computer Science at the Moscow State University.

He defended the thesis «Mathematical modeling and computer analysis of liquid metal systems» for the degree of Doctor of Physical and Mathematical Sciences (2009).

Author of 13 books and more than 90 scientific articles.

References

Bibliography

External links
 Annals of the Moscow University
 MSU CMC
 Scientific works of Igor Lomov
 Scientific works of Igor Lomov

Russian computer scientists
Russian mathematicians
Living people
Academic staff of Moscow State University
1956 births
Moscow State University alumni